Steerage is a term for the lowest category of passenger accommodation in a ship. In the nineteenth and early twentieth century, considerable numbers of persons travelled from their homeland to seek a new life elsewhere, in many cases North America and Australia. Many of those people were destitute in their homeland and had the minimum of resources to procure transportation. The term later widened to imply the lowest category of accommodation on a passenger vessel.

Steerage class travel
Steerage refers to the lowest possible category of long-distance steamer travel. It was available to very poor people, usually emigrants seeking a new life in the New World, chiefly North America and Australia. In many cases these people had no financial resources and were attempting to escape destitution at home. Consequently they needed transportation at an absolute minimum cost. In many cases they provided their own bedding and food. Steerage was very cramped and there was hardly any room for fresh air to get there. Many people died in steerage.
The term steerage originated in the fact that these passengers were allowed space in the machinery spaces of the ship (as opposed to cabins and ordinary public areas), but the term was used more generally to refer to the lowest category of accommodation, usually not including proper sleeping accommodation. In time the designation came to refer to the lowest category in general, and in modern times is sometimes used sarcastically to refer to any uncomfortable accommodation in an airliner, ship or train.

Beds were often long rows of large shared bunks with straw mattresses and no bed linens.

References

External links
 "Steerage - Immigrant Journeys to Their New Home", GG Archives
 "Steerage Class - The Immigrant Journey: The Fellowship of the Steerage (1905)", GG Archives
  – Special Collection of Rare Steerage Souvenir Passenger Lists produced by the German Steamship Lines Hamburg-Amerika and Norddeutscher Lloyd.

Shipbuilding
Nautical terminology
Passenger ships
Ship compartments